Henriette Mertz (1896 – August 17, 1985) was an American patent attorney from Chicago and a proponent of pseudoarchaeological hyperdiffusionism in relation to ancient American history. During World War II, she worked as a code-breaker for the U.S. government's cryptography department. She published several controversial works during the 1960s and 1970s relating to the early discovery and settlement of America.

She died on August 17, 1985 in Chicago at 89; her book The Mystic Symbol was published posthumously.

Career 
Mertz was a cryptographer for the U.S. Navy during World War II. She then worked at the U.S. Copyright Office in Washington, D.C., as a patent lawyer. She traveled extensively to locations including the Amazon, the Andes, and Mexico.

Theories 
In 1936, Mertz met a man in Mexico whom she said "looked to be pure Chinese" but described himself as "Indian". It turned out that his family was originally from China, but had settled and lived in Mexico for many generations. After the war, she read An Inglorious Columbus (1885) by writer Edward P. Vining, which argued that Chinese explorers had founded Mexican culture and religion. To Mertz, this explained the curious case of the Mexican-Chinese-Indian man she had met many years prior. Lacking any training as a historian, she started developing her own theories about the Chinese discovery of the Americas, and decided to self-publish Pale Ink (1953) after the manuscript was rejected by commercial publishers.

Bat Creek Stone 
In 1964, Mertz suggested that a photograph of the Bat Creek inscription had been published upside down. Later Cyrus H. Gordon,  scholar of Near Eastern cultures and ancient languages, suggested that the inscriptions were derived from a Hebrew alphabet from the 1st century AD but today mainstream archaeologists consider it to be a fraud.

Chinese voyages 
In her work entitled Pale Ink (self-published c. 1958), Mertz proposed that two accounts of Chinese travels to Fusang—one found in the Shan Hai Jing (which Mertz dates to 2250 BC) and the other by Buddhist missionary Hui Shen in 499 AD—describe visits to the American continent. As supporting evidence she proposed that the Milk River inscriptions were Chinese glyphs made by one of the exploration parties. According to author David Hatcher Childress, Mertz also interpreted Fusang as meaning "fir trees" in Chinese, and ruminated that they might refer to the fir trees of British Columbia. The hypothesis had long been rejected by academic sinologists having been first advocated in English by Charles Godfrey Leland in 1875, but apparently Mertz was unaware of these facts. In her book, Mertz also proposed that Quetzalcoatl was Hui Shen, the 5th century Buddhist traveler to Fusang. About Mertz's hypotheses, sinologist Joseph Needham writes in a footnote that "the proposed identities in general require a heroic suspension of disbelief".

Published works 
 1986: The Mystic Symbol: Mark of the Michigan Mound Builders. Global Books, .
 1976: Atlantis: Dwelling Place of the Gods, .
 1974: Gods from the Far East: How the Chinese Discovered America. Seattle, Washington: Ballantine Books, .
 1964: The Wine Dark Sea: Homer's Heroic Epic of the North Atlantic, ASIN: B0006CHG68. 
 1958, 1972: Pale Ink: Two Ancient Records of Chinese Exploration in America. Swallow Press, .
 1957: The Nephtali: One Lost Tribe, ASIN: B0007EYTXS.

References

External links 
 Pale Ink by Henriette Mertz (1953)

1896 births
1985 deaths
Pseudohistorians
Atlantis proponents
20th-century American writers
20th-century American women writers
American women archaeologists
20th-century American archaeologists
Fringe theories